Musen Mata is a village of Atru tehsil in the Baran district, in Rajasthan, India. The nearest town is Atru, which is 11 km away. It is located 46 km from the district headquarter, Baran. Its population is 892. It comes under Antana Gram Panchayat. In the village, there is an upper primary school and a small health care center.

Population 
The Musen Mata Village located in Atru Tehsil, 892 People are living in this Village, 462 are males and 430 are females as per 2011 census. Expected Musen Mata population 2021/2022 is between 874 and 999. Literate people are 611 out of 370 are male and 241 are female. People living in Musen Mata depend on multiple skills, total workers are 443 out of which men are 230 and women are 213. Total 354 Cultivators are depended on agriculture farming out of 186 are cultivated by men and 168 are women. 24 people works in agricultural land as a labour in Musen Mata, men are 15 and 9 are women.

Geographical Information 
It is situated on the Bhupasi River. The cartographic coordinates are 24.803554°N 76.629587°E. According to census data from 2011, the area of the village is 469.08 hectares.

Social Structure of Musen Mata 
As per available data from the year 2009, 892 persons live in 191 house holds in the village Musen Mata. There are 430 female individuals and 462 male individuals in the village. Females constitute 48.21% and males constitute 51.79% of the total population.

There are 187 scheduled castes persons of which 91 are females and 96 are males. Females constitute 48.66% and males constitute 51.34% of the scheduled castes population. Scheduled castes constitute 20.96% of the total population.

There are 611 scheduled tribes persons of which 293 are females and 318 are males. Females constitute 47.95% and males constitute 52.05% of the scheduled tribes population. Scheduled tribes constitute 68.5% of the total population.

Population density of Musen Mata is 190.16 persons per square kilometer.

Tourist Place 
There is a very famous temple of Ma Ambika Mandir in Musen Mata. Every year a fair is held here in the month of April.

References 

Gram Panchayats and Villages in Atru Tehsil